Rainbow Ruby is a CGI animated television series aimed at children, produced by 38 °C Animation Studio and CJ E&M Corporation in South Korea, China Entertainment Corporation (a subsidiary of China ACG Group, which is an enterprise directly under the PRC Government's Ministry of Culture) in China and DHX Media in Canada.

Plot
At Ruby's house, a small event related to the main plot of each episode occurs, before a red jewelry on the chest of Choco, Ruby's Teddy bear, flashes with a melody. Ruby then takes Choco to her room, and the two 'transport' themselves to the Rainbow Village  There, Ruby hears an explanation from Ling Ling, the mayor of Rainbow Village, and transforms herself using her Rainbow Roller into an appropriate clothing to solve problems. Each episode concludes, back home, with another small event.

Characters
Rainbow Ruby (voiced by Alyssya Swales) is a girl who can transform into various of jobs to help her toy friends with her Rainbow Roller. Often, she's simply called Ruby. 

Choco is Rainbow Ruby's teddy bear. 
Gina (voiced by Shannon Chan-Kent) is a wooden puppet pirate.
Mayor Ling Ling (voiced by Johnny Yong Bosch), a stuffed elephant who's the mayor of Rainbow Village.
Jessy (voiced by Kate Davis) is a baby doll who has peach/fair skin, red hair in pigtails with brown eyes, a pink nose, freckles, and rosy cheeks. She wears two yellow ribbons, a yellow tank top shirt with a white collar and a blue ribbon on her neck, a yellow diaper with white polka dots, and pink slippers.
Princess Kiki (voiced by Olivia Charles) is a sweet young porcelain doll princess.
Daisy is a pink-coloured reindeer plush toy.
 Prince Frederick is a porcelain doll and a friend of Princess Kiki.
Ellie is a nature-loving stuffed sheep who sometimes glows.
Thunderbell (voiced by Brian Drummond) is a stuffed bunny playing scooter. He serves as the town's mailman.
Felicia (voiced by Olivia Charles) is a fairy doll.
Paige (voiced by Kate Davis) is a stylish paper ballerina doll.
Mr. Sloth (voiced by Johnny Yong Bosch)
Chirpee
 The Harmony Family are a family of nesting dolls. There are 5 of them: a father, a mother, and 3 children.
 Poppies
 Miss Swan
 Dino the Dinosaur

Episodes

Season 1
The series is distributed as 52 single episodes and as 26 double feature episodes. The airings on Family Jr. in Canada are shown in the form of the latter.

Season 2
The series is distributed as 26 single episodes. The airings on RTV (Indonesia) in Indonesian are shown in the form of the latter.

Release
Rainbow Ruby was first showcased in the licensing market at MIPJunior 2015 in Cannes, France, as announced in September that year. At the market, the series was announced to be the first animated series to "support girls' and women's education in partnership with UNESCO". On March 12, 2016, at the 2016 Global Education Skills Forum held in United Arab Emirates, the UNESCO and the CJ Group (the parent of CJ E&M) signed a partnership agreement to use Rainbow Ruby: this agreement is a part of the Better Life for Girls campaign, which was launched in November 2014 by CJ E&M and UNESCO, and "a share of the sales from Rainbow Ruby character products will be contributed to UNESCO's global fund for promoting girls' right to education", according to UNESCO.

DHX Media has the distribution rights of the series for Canada, United States and the EMEA regions except France. CPLG, a brand licensing agency which became a subsidiary of DHX Media in 2012, represents Rainbow Ruby worldwide except Asia and Latin America. Within Mainland China, all the related rights of the series are exercised by China Entertainment Corporation.

At a business presentation to South Korean media held on February 28, 2017, CJ E&M announced that the series was sold to thirty broadcasters outside South Korea. Also, the company announced that it will have a multimedia campaign in South Korea involving the series.

Broadcast

Canada
In Canada, the series was premiered on April 23, 2016, on Family Jr.; it was then broadcast on its regular slot on Mondays starting April 25. The French language version debuted on April 9, 2018, on Télémagino; for its first week, Télémagino premiered each episode per day from April 9 to 13, but premieres the rest every Monday. Both Family Jr. and Télémagino are specialty television channels which DHX Media acquired in 2014.

South Korea
In South Korea, the series premiered on March 2, 2017, on EBS1, a public service terrestrial television channel operated by the Educational Broadcasting System. From April of the same year, the series will also be broadcast on Tooniverse, a specialty television channel available on multi-channel television platforms which was acquired by the CJ Group in 2009, before it was integrated into the then-newly formed company CJ E&M's broadcasting division in 2011. Other specialty channels that will broadcast the series include Animax in South Korea.

Previously, it was reported in January 2016 that the series would be launched between March and April that year on Tooniverse, and was reported in July 2016 that it would be within the year, but there have been no indications since.

Season 2 had been released; from April 2 to June 26, 2020, and return had been released; from August 27, 2020.

China
In China, the series gained a governmental license of approval for distribution in the Mainland television market as a domestic animated production on April 19, 2016, and it was named as one of the Outstanding Domestic Animated Television Productions in the second quarter of 2016 by the State Administration of Press, Publication, Radio, Film and Television, which gives an advantage when selling such programs to broadcasters.

Rainbow Ruby premiered on March 28, 2017, on CCTV-14, where it was given a time slot of Monday to Friday evenings.

Other countries 
The series was also broadcast in multiple countries around the world. In August 2016, outside the original networks, Rainbow Ruby was acquired by ABS-CBN (via Yey!) (Philippines), RTV (Indonesia), Thai PBS (Thailand), Yoyo TV (Taiwan), and Duronto TV (Bangladesh).

In January 2017, CJ E&M/DHX Media secured deals with 10 channels to air the series.

On February 28, 2017, at a business presentation, CJ E&M announced that the series was sold to thirty broadcasters outside South Korea, with ten of them already airing the series.

Publications 
In South Korea, Haksan Publishing published a series of comics adapted from each episode, using the still images from the television series. The books follow the episode order of South Korean airings.

In Mainland China, the Encyclopedia of China Publishing House published a series of story books adapted from each episode, using the still images from the television series. The books follow the episode order of television airings in China.

Awards and recognition
Rainbow Ruby won a Grand Prize in Animations and Comics at the 2015's  presented by China Animation Association, being ranked at number 7. The ceremony was held on October 1, 2015, as a part of the year's edition of Shenzhen Gameshow.

References

External links 
 Rainbow Ruby at Family Jr.
 Rainbow Ruby at Family Go
 Rainbow Ruby at DHX Media
 Rainbow Ruby at 38 °C Animation Studio 
 
 Rainbow Ruby at Educational Broadcasting System 

2010s Canadian animated television series
2016 Canadian television series debuts
Anime-influenced Western animated television series
Canadian children's animated comedy television series
Canadian children's animated fantasy television series
Chinese children's animated comedy television series
Chinese children's animated fantasy television series
South Korean children's animated comedy television series
South Korean children's animated fantasy television series
Family Jr. original programming
Television series by CJ E&M
Television series by DHX Media
Animated television series about children
English-language television shows